The Military Intelligence and Security Service (Dutch: Militaire Inlichtingen- en Veiligheidsdienst, MIVD) is the military intelligence service of the Netherlands. It was formerly known as the Militaire Inlichtingendienst (MID) and received its current name in 2002. The MIVD is part of the Ministry of Defence.

History
The forerunner of all intelligence services in the Netherlands was the GS III, which was created shortly before World War I. This service later (after WW II) became the LAMID (Army Intelligence Service). In 1986, the Government of the Netherlands started a reform of all (Navy, Army and Air Force) military intelligence and security services. The MID (Military Intelligence Service) was formed. In 1989 and 1990 the existing branches (Navy, Army, Air Force, General Intelligence) of the MID were united to make the service stronger. After that reform the single military intelligence service was renamed Military Intelligence and Security Service (MIVD) in 2002, with more focus on challenges the 21st century would present.

Mission
 Collecting information on potential and military forces in other countries;
 Collecting information on areas where Dutch troops may be stationed, notably on peace keeping missions;
 Investigating problems involving officers of the Royal Netherlands Army;
 Collecting information to prevent any harm to the Army;
 Counter-terrorism and counter-espionage;
 Other military subjects as determined by the Government.

Oversight and accountability
The Minister of Defence is politically responsible for the MIVD. Oversight is provided by two bodies:
 The Committee for the Intelligence and Security Services (Dutch: Commissie voor de Inlichtingen- en Veiligheidsdiensten, CIVD), comprising the faction leaders of the major political parties represented in the House of Representatives.
 An Oversight Committee (Dutch: Commissie van Toezicht op de Inlichtingen- en Veiligheidsdiensten, CTIVD) appointed by the House of Representatives. 
The service is, like other intelligence services in the Netherlands, governed by the Wet op de Inlichtingen- en Veiligheidsdiensten 2002 (Law on the Intelligence and Security Services 2002).

References

External links

 Official website of the MIVD

Inlichtingen- en Veiligheidsdiensten
Militaire Inlichtingen- en Veiligheidsdienst
Cold War military history of the Netherlands
Military intelligence agencies